Yang Bi (born May 1922 - 4 March 1968) was a Chinese translator and associate professor at Fudan University.

Biography
Yang was born in May 1922 in Shanghai, while her ancestral home in Wuxi, Jiangsu. Her father Yang Yinhang ((); 1878 - 1945) was a jurist who graduated from Waseda University and the University of Pennsylvania. Her mother Tang Xu'an was a housewife. Her sister Yang Jiang was a writer and translator. She was raised in Suzhou. She studied and then taught at Aurora Women's College of Arts and Sciences. In 1952, Aurora Women's College of Arts and Sciences was merged into Fudan University, she was promoted to associate professor. In 1968, she was asked to account for the International Labour Office in the "Cleaning up the Class Movement". She died during that movement at the age of 46.

Translation
 Vanity Fair (William Makepeace Thackeray)

References

Bibliography
 

1922 births
Writers from Shanghai
1968 deaths
20th-century Chinese translators
English–Chinese translators
Academic staff of Fudan University
People persecuted to death during the Cultural Revolution
People of the Republic of China
People's Republic of China translators
Educators from Shanghai